Ballynacarrow, locally Ballinacarrow, is a village in County Sligo, Ireland. The Temple House estate is south of the village.

Ballynacarrow was designated as a census town by the Central Statistics Office for the first time in the 2016 census, at which time it had a population of 202 people.

Transport
Ballynacarrow is on the N17 Galway to Collooney road. The village is a stop on the Bus Éireann Galway to Derry Expressway route 64.

Notable people
The Irish-American orator and politician Bourke Cockran was born in Ballynacarrow in 1854.

See also
 List of towns and villages in Ireland

References

Towns and villages in County Sligo